Kurdia can refer to:

Kurdia, the region of Kurdistan
Turkish Kurdistan, the Kurdish region in Turkey also known as North Kurdistan.
Kurdia (katydid), a genus of bush crickets or katydids